World Series of Poker is a video game based on the popular gambling tournament World Series of Poker. It is succeeded by World Series of Poker: Tournament of Champions and World Series of Poker 2008: Battle for the Bracelets. It was produced for the GameCube, PlayStation 2, Xbox, PlayStation Portable, and PC.

Games included in the World Series of Poker package are Omaha, Omaha Hi-Low Split, Seven Card Stud, Seven Card Stud Hi-Low Split, Razz (Seven Stud Lowball), and Texas Hold 'em.

Reception

The game received "generally unfavorable reviews" on all platforms except the Xbox version, which received "mixed" reviews, according to the review aggregation website Metacritic.

References

External links
 'The World Series of Poker Official Website' at WSOP.com
 

2005 video games
 
Activision games
GameCube games
Left Field Productions games
PlayStation 2 games
PlayStation Portable games
Poker video games
Windows games
Xbox games
Video games developed in the United States